Rososz may refer to the following places:
Rososz, Łódź Voivodeship (central Poland)
Rososz, Lublin Voivodeship (east Poland)
Rososz, Grójec County in Masovian Voivodeship (east-central Poland)
Rososz, Mińsk County in Masovian Voivodeship (east-central Poland)
Rososz, Ostrołęka County in Masovian Voivodeship (east-central Poland)
Rososz, Ostrów Mazowiecka County in Masovian Voivodeship (east-central Poland)
Rososz, Siedlce County in Masovian Voivodeship (east-central Poland)